James E. Fenelon (May 25, 1846 – September 24, 1915) was a member of the Wisconsin State Assembly.

Biography
Fenelon was born in County Carlow, Ireland around 1845; sources differ on the date. A Roman Catholic, he attended what is now Marquette University High School in Milwaukee, Wisconsin. Later, Fenelon owned a farm in Ripon, Wisconsin. In the 1880s he owned a meat market in Ripon, which was destroyed in a fire in 1885. He died on September 24, 1915.

State legislative career
A Republican, Fenelon was elected to the Assembly in 1900 and 1908. Previously, he had refused a Democratic nomination for the Wisconsin State Senate in 1884.

References

20th-century Roman Catholics
Politicians from County Carlow
Irish emigrants to the United States (before 1923)
Politicians from Milwaukee
People from Ripon, Wisconsin
Republican Party members of the Wisconsin State Assembly
Farmers from Wisconsin
1845 births
1915 deaths
Marquette University High School alumni